Theodore E. Russell (born 1936) was the first U.S. ambassador to Slovakia (1993–1996). He subsequently served as deputy commandant for international affairs at the U.S. Army War College in Carlisle, Pennsylvania.

Career
His career has included service in East and West Europe, as deputy director for European regional political and economic affairs in the State Department and deputy assistant administrator for international activities at the Environmental Protection Agency. Since his retirement from the Foreign Service, Russell has served as a political-military affairs consultant for a number of military training exercises involving the Balkans, Far East, Middle East, and South Asia. For several years, he was also associated with an independent public television network where he served as international relations director. He has lectured on U.S. foreign policy in Central Europe and contributed to CSIS studies on NATO enlargement and on Slovakia's security and foreign policy strategy. He is a founding chairman of Friends of Slovakia.

Personal
Russell holds a B.A. in history from Yale, an M.A.L.D degree from the Fletcher School of Law and Diplomacy at Tufts University, and is a graduate of the National War College.

References

Ambassadors of the United States to Slovakia
Living people
1936 births
United States Foreign Service personnel